Sucevița is a commune in Suceava County, in the historical region of Bukovina, northeastern Romania. It is composed of two villages, namely Sucevița and Voievodeasa. Sucevița Monastery, part of the UNESCO World Heritage Site series of the painted Churches of Moldavia, is located in the commune.

Natives 

 Józef Weber, Roman Catholic prelate

References 

Communes in Suceava County
Localities in Southern Bukovina
Duchy of Bukovina